The Teton River (pronounced "TEE-tuhn") is located in northwestern Montana, in the Western United States
Its watershed is within Teton County and Chouteau County, Montana.

Course
The Teton River headwaters are in the southern Lewis Range of the Rocky Mountains at the continental divide, in the Lewis and Clark National Forest.

It flows southeast, then east, down from the Lewis mountains and across Teton County, past the town of Choteau. It is joined by Muddy Creek and Deep Creek. It continues flowing east, passing near Fort Benton to its confluence with the Marias River.

Variant names
The Teton River has also been known as the: 
Breast River
Fancy River
Mone-e-kis, Monekis
Rose River
Tansey River
Tansy River, Tanzey River, or Tanzy River

See also

List of rivers of Montana
Montana Stream Access Law
Cracon Du Nez

References

External links
State of Montana: Teton River photos
Big Sky Fishing: Photos of the Teton River

Rivers of Montana
Tributaries of the Missouri River
Rivers of Chouteau County, Montana
Bodies of water of Teton County, Montana
Lewis Range